Wang Yinan (born September 19, 1989) is a Chinese Paralympic swimmer. At the 2012 Summer Paralympics he won 3 gold medals, 1 silver medal and 1 bronze medal. He won the bronze medal at the Men's 400 metre freestyle S8 event at the 2016 Summer Paralympics with 4:32.78.

References

Paralympic swimmers of China
Swimmers at the 2012 Summer Paralympics
Paralympic gold medalists for China
Living people
World record holders in paralympic swimming
1989 births
Paralympic silver medalists for China
Paralympic bronze medalists for China
Medalists at the 2012 Summer Paralympics
S8-classified Paralympic swimmers
Medalists at the 2016 Summer Paralympics
Medalists at the World Para Swimming Championships
Paralympic medalists in swimming
Chinese male freestyle swimmers
21st-century Chinese people